American Short Fiction is a nationally circulated literary magazine founded in 1991 and based in Austin, Texas. Issued triannually, American Short Fiction publishes short fiction, novel excerpts, an occasional novella, and strives to publish work by both established and emerging contemporary authors. The magazine seeks out stories "that dive into the wreck, that stretch the reader between recognition and surprise, that conjure a particular world with delicate expertise—stories that take a different way home."

American Short Fiction sponsors two annual short fiction contests, the Halifax Ranch Fiction Prize judged in 2018 by ZZ Packer, and the American  Fiction Prize. The magazine also sponsors a reading series in Austin as well as online workshops for fiction writers.

History and publication 

Founded in 1991 by editor Laura Furman, American Short Fiction was published until 1998 by the University of Texas Press in cooperation with the Texas Center for Writers and National Public Radio's "The Sound of Writing" broadcast. During its initial run, the magazine was a two-time finalist for the National Magazine Award for fiction and contributors’ work was anthologized in The Best American Short Stories, The O. Henry Prize Stories, and The Pushcart Prize: Best of the Small Presses.

The journal was purchased in 2003 by Badgerdog Literary Publishing and released the first issue of its second run in Winter 2006. Following a hiatus in 2012, the magazine reorganized under current editors Rebecca Markovits and Adeena Reitberger, and is now published by the Austin, Texas-based non-profit American Short Fiction, Inc.

The journal maintains high standards for publication. In April 2017, Bret Anthony Johnston's story, "Half of What Atlee Rouse Knows About Horses" featured in American Short Fiction's 25th Anniversary Issue, won The Sunday Times EFG Short Story Award. Two recent stories, Danielle Evans's "Richard of York Gave Battle in Vain" and Kyle McCarthy's "Ancient Rome" have been chosen to appear in The Best American Short Stories 2017.  Contributions have also been anthologized in The Best American Nonrequired Reading and have appeared in Best American Fantasy.

American Short Fiction editors 

1991–1994: Laura Furman
1994–1998: Joseph Kruppa
2005–2006: Rebecca Bengal
2006–2009: Stacey Swann
2009–2012: Jill Meyers
2013–present: Rebecca Markovits and Adeena Reitberger

Past contributors 

Joyce Carol Oates
Lydia Davis
Bret Anthony Johnston
Lauren Groff
Laura van den Berg
Don Lee
Dagoberto Gilb
Dan Chaon
Louise Erdrich
Ann Beattie
Charles Baxter
Ursula K. Le Guin
Caitlin Horrocks
Antonya Nelson
Nathan Englander
Benjamin Percy
Vendela Vida
Desmond Hogan
Ander Monson
Paul Yoon
Jess Row
Maud Casey
Ethan Rutherford
Karl Taro Greenfeld
Christie Hodgen
Patrick Somerville
Josh Weil
Matt Bell
Mary Kay Zuravleff
Andrea Barrett
Alexander Chee
Danielle Evans
Jennifer DuBois
Molly Antopol

See also 
List of literary magazines

References 

1. American Short Fiction: About

2. Ankrum, Nora. "Write of Passage"

3. McGarvey, Shannon. "Call it a Comeback: American Short Fiction Returns Once Again"

4. Wolitzer, Meg. "Best American Short Stories 2017"

External links
 American Short Fiction (official site)

1991 establishments in Texas
Literary magazines published in the United States
Magazines established in 1991
Magazines published in Austin, Texas
Triannual magazines published in the United States